The 1982–83 Sheffield Shield season was the 81st season of the Sheffield Shield, the domestic first-class cricket competition of Australia. Western Australia topped the regular league ladder but New South Wales won the title. This was the first time that the championship was decided by virtue of a final held between the two leading sides in the league ladder.

Table

Final

Statistics

Most Runs
Graham Yallop 1254

Most Wickets
Joel Garner 55

References

Sheffield Shield
Sheffield Shield
Sheffield Shield seasons